Saul Ewing LLP is a U.S.-based law firm with 16 offices and approximately 400 attorneys providing a broad range of legal services. Its offices are located along the East Coast from Boston to Miami and extend into the Midwest by way of Chicago.
On September 1, 2017 Saul Ewing LLP and Arnstein & Lehr LLP merged to form Saul Ewing Arnstein & Lehr LLP. In November 2022, the firm changed its name back to Saul Ewing LLP as part of a rebrand effort.

History
In 1921, Maurice Bower Saul begins Saul, Ewing, Remick & Saul, along with his brother, Walter Biddle Saul, Joseph Ewing and Raymond Remick.

The partners combined their strengths in banking, estate management, litigation, international commerce, tax and real-estate development to work with many of the clients served by John G. Johnson, the leader of the Philadelphia bar who had died in 1917. Over the years, the firm continued to grow, expanding outside of Pennsylvania in 1982 with an office in Wilmington, Delaware. By 1998, the firm attained regional status, with offices in Pennsylvania, New Jersey, Delaware and Maryland. In 2000, the firm shortened its name to Saul Ewing and became a limited liability partnership. The firm expanded its footprint with offices in Boston, Massachusetts (2011) and Pittsburgh, Pennsylvania. (2012).

Saul Ewing was named a "Pennsylvania Powerhouse" firm by Law360 for several years. Under the direction of Managing Partner Barry F. Levin, in 2017, the firm completed its largest merger to date, combining with Chicago-based Arnstein & Lehr LLP, an established, 125-year-old firm, known for its litigation, bankruptcy and real estate practices. The combination added four offices in Illinois and Florida and 140 attorneys, bringing the firm's total number of attorneys to more than 400.

Notable cases and deals
Penn State child sex abuse scandal – As reported in the Wall Street Journal, "The firm, which represents more than 100 colleges and universities, has been serving as lead counsel to Penn State University  in relation to the sexual-abuse scandal involving former assistant football coach Jerry Sandusky.” 
Pennsylvania counsel in a $2.65 billion, 123-mile natural gas interstate pipeline expansion project.
Representation of Cantor Fitzgerald in its effort to recover for business interruption losses due to the 9/11 terrorist attacks that killed 658 Cantor employees.
Representation of Trust Preferred Holders, winning $100 million recovery in the Conseco bankruptcy in federal bankruptcy court.

Core services
As a full-service law firm, Saul Ewing provides legal advice and assistance in the following areas;:bankruptcy and restructuring; corporate; cybersecurity and privacy; intellectual property; labor and employment; litigation; mergers and acquisitions; personal wealth, estates and trusts; private equity; public finance; real estate; tax; and venture capital.

Core industries
Cannabis
Construction
Energy
Food, Beverage & Agribusiness
Health Care
Higher Education
Insurance
Real Estate
Sports & Entertainment

Offices
The firm’s administrative headquarters are in the Philadelphia, Pennsylvania office and its largest office is in Chicago, Illinois. The remaining offices are in Baltimore, Maryland; Boston, Massachusetts; Chesterbrook, Pennsylvania; Fort Lauderdale, Florida; Harrisburg, Pennsylvania; Miami, Florida; Minneapolis, Minnesota; Newark, New Jersey; New York, New York; Pittsburgh, Pennsylvania; Princeton, New Jersey; Washington D.C.; West Palm Beach, Florida and Wilmington, Delaware.

Notable lawyers and alumni
Jim Durkin, Republican Minority Leader of the Illinois State Senate.
Lawrence Coughlin, a Republican member of the United States House of Representatives from 1969 to 1993, representing the 13th district of Pennsylvania.
Earl G. Harrison, Dean of the University of Pennsylvania Law School, and served as U.S. Commissioner of Immigration (1942-44). In 1945, he was asked by President Harry Truman "to report on the condition of Jews in displaced person camps. His report led to creation of the State of Israel.”
Henry “Hank” Ruth, Watergate special prosecutor, took leave from the firm in 1973 to be chief deputy in the Watergate Investigation. In 1974 he was appointed the third special prosecutor. One year later he issued a 271-page report on the investigation and, upon resigning, returned to the Philadelphia office.
Albert Henry Loeb, in 1893, along with his partner Sydney Adler, founded a law firm which later would become Arnstein & Lehr. In 1895 Loeb handled the reorganization of Sears, Roebuck and Company and incorporated the company in Illinois. In 1903 he became a full time Sears executive and subsequently the number two man in the organization.
Sigmund Livingston, founder and first president of the Anti-Defamation League.
J. Hamilton Lewis, served as a United States Senator from Illinois. He was the first to be elected as Majority Whip. He was a partner in the Firm between terms in the Senate and returned to the Senate in 1930 where he served until his death in 1939.
L.M.(Lucie Mae) Varner in 1934 became the Firm’s first woman partner. She was one of the few women lawyers in Chicago when, in 1929, she joined the Firm as an associate and was a part of the Firm’s very active commercial  real estate practice.

References

External links 
 

Law firms based in Philadelphia
Law firms established in 1893
1893 establishments in Pennsylvania